Jasmin Selberg (born 11 August 1999) is a German model and beauty pageant titleholder who was crowned Miss International 2022.

Early life and education
Jasmin Selberg was born in Tallinn, Estonia. Her family moved from Estonia to Germany when she was one year-old.

Pageantry

The Miss Globe 2021
Selberg represented Germany at Miss Globe International 2021 pageant and finished in the top 15, and winning the Miss Social Media award.

Miss Universe Germany 2022
Selberg joined the Miss Universe Germany 2002 pageant and finished in the top 16.

Miss Supranational Germany 2022
Selberg replaced Sabrina Binder, the winner of Miss Supranational Germany 2022, who was unable to compete in Miss Supranational 2022.

Miss Supranational 2022
Selberg represented Germany at the Miss Supranational 2022 pageant, where she finished in 27th place.

Miss International Germany 2022
Selberg won the Miss International Germany 2022 pageant.

Miss International 2022
After winning the national pageant, Selberg represented Germany at Miss International 2022, held at Tokyo Dome City Hall, Tokyo, Japan on December 13, 2022.  

During the final round of speech portion of the pageant, each finalist were given a chance to express their plans if crowned Miss International and share their personal advocacies. Selberg said:

Someone I really look up to told me that it's good to start small before doing something big. And I would say I dare to dream big because that just say... Let's just begin with that it's good to support your locals. And this is what I want to do if I was lucky enough to be the next Miss International. Because it is not just what the big things are that we do—the little things matter because small things have big echoes. Let us start to plant flowers in our gardens for the bees. Or let's just pick up trash because it is beneficial for our environment. It's not just the big things that matter, but also the small and so does a good heart, kindness, and peace which we all should be ambassadors of.

At the end of the event, Selberg was crowned as Miss International 2022, succeeding Miss International 2019 Sireethorn Leearamwat of Thailand. She became the third German winner following Ingrid Finger at Miss International 1965 and Iris Klein at Miss International 1989. Selberg was also the first European winner since Alejandra Andreu of Spain, who won Miss International 2008.

See also

Cristina Gonzales

References

 

 
1999 births
Living people
German beauty pageant winners
Miss International 2021 delegates
Miss International winners
Estonian emigrants to Germany
German people of Estonian descent